Meridemis furtiva is a species of moth of the  family Tortricidae. It is found in Nepal and Vietnam.

References

Moths described in 1976
Archipini